Wheel stop may refer to:
 Wheel chock, for aircraft or road vehicles
 Railway wheel stop